Mardy Fish was the defending champion, but did not participate this year.

Thomas Johansson won the singles event at the 2004 If Stockholm Open tennis tournament, beating Andre Agassi in the final, 3–6, 6–3, 7–6(7–4).

Seeds

Draw

Finals

Top half

Bottom half

External links
 Main draw
 Qualifying draw 

2004 Stockholm Open
2004 ATP Tour